Bu Tao, (born 15 January 1983 in Xi'an, Shaanxi, China) is a left-handed pitcher for the Chinese national baseball team.

He competed in the 2006, 2009 and 2013 World Baseball Classic representing China. His number is 68. Tao has also been selected to represent China in baseball at the 2008 Summer Olympics.

References 

1983 births
2006 World Baseball Classic players
2009 World Baseball Classic players
2013 World Baseball Classic players
Baseball players at the 2006 Asian Games
Baseball players at the 2008 Summer Olympics
Baseball players at the 2010 Asian Games
Living people
Olympic baseball players of China
Chinese baseball players
Sichuan Dragons players
Sportspeople from Xi'an
Asian Games competitors for China